Teddy Buist (4 May 1885 – 30 June 1959) was an Australian rules footballer who played for South Melbourne and Fitzroy in the VFL.

Buist, a wingman, made his debut in 1906 with South Melbourne and spent two seasons with the club. He then played for Prahran in the Victorian Football Association (VFA), representing the VFA in a match against South Australia. Buist moved to Adelaide and played for Norwood in 1909 and 1901. He returned to the league in 1911 and joined Fitzroy with whom he would play in premiership teams in 1913 and 1916.

References

External links

1885 births
Sydney Swans players
Prahran Football Club players
Norwood Football Club players
Fitzroy Football Club players
Fitzroy Football Club Premiership players
Australian rules footballers from Victoria (Australia)
1959 deaths
Two-time VFL/AFL Premiership players